The following lists events that happened in 1969 in Iceland.

Incumbents
President – Kristján Eldjárn
Prime Minister – Bjarni Benediktsson

Events

Births

5 September – Rúnar Kristinsson, footballer
19 September – Jóhann Jóhannsson, composer (d. 2018)
12 November – Helena Ólafsdóttir, footballer.

Deaths

References

 
1960s in Iceland
Iceland
Iceland
Years of the 20th century in Iceland